Brent Scowcroft (March 19, 1925August 6, 2020) was a United States Air Force officer who was a two-time United States National Security Advisor, first under U.S. President Gerald Ford and then under George H. W. Bush. He served as Military Assistant to President Richard Nixon and as Deputy Assistant to the President for National Security Affairs in the Nixon and Ford administrations. He served as Chairman of the President's Foreign Intelligence Advisory Board under President George W. Bush from 2001 to 2005, and advised President Barack Obama on choosing his national security team.

Early life and education

Scowcroft was born March 19, 1925, in Ogden, Utah, the son of Lucile (née Ballantyne) and James Scowcroft, a grocer and business owner. He was a descendant of early 19th-century British immigrants from England and Scotland, along with immigrants from Denmark and Norway. He elaborated upon his relationship with the Church of Jesus Christ of Latter-day Saints in a 1999 oral history: "I have close personal ties to some of the church leadership. They would not consider me a good Mormon. I don't live by all of the rules the Mormons like—I like a glass of wine and a cup of coffee. But yes, I do consider myself a Mormon. It's part of a religious and a cultural heritage."

Scowcroft received his undergraduate degree and commission in the United States Army Air Forces from the United States Military Academy at West Point, New York, in June 1947. With the establishment of an independent United States Air Force in September 1947, his commission transferred to the USAF. Scowcroft subsequently earned an MA (1953) and PhD (1967) in international relations from Columbia University.

Career

Having envisioned life as a fighter pilot following World War II, Scowcroft completed his pilot training in October 1948 following his commissioning as an Air Force Second Lieutenant in 1947 and received his Air Force Command Pilot Wings. However, on January 6, 1949, while on flight training with a North American P-51 Mustang, his aircraft experienced engine trouble after taking-off from Grenier Army Airfield, causing the plane to crash-land. Although his injuries were not critical, Scowcroft assumed that he would never fly again and considered another career within the Air Force. He served in a variety of operational and administrative positions from 1948 to 1953. In the course of his military career, he held positions at the Joint Chiefs of Staff, headquarters of the United States Air Force, and the Office of the Assistant Secretary of Defense for International Security Affairs. His other assignments included: faculty positions at the United States Air Force Academy and the United States Military Academy, and Assistant Air Attaché in the American Embassy in Belgrade, Yugoslavia.

As a senior officer, General Scowcroft was assigned to Headquarters U.S. Air Force in the office of the Deputy Chief of Staff, Plans and Operations, and served in the Long Range Planning Division, Directorate of Doctrine, Concepts and Objectives from 1964 to 1966. He next attended the National War College at Fort McNair, followed by assignment in July 1968 to the Office of the Assistant Secretary of Defense for International Security Affairs. In September 1969, he was reassigned to Headquarters U.S. Air Force in the Directorate of Plans as Deputy Assistant for National Security Council Matters. In March 1970 he joined the Joint Chiefs of Staff organization and became the Special Assistant to the Director of the Joint Staff.

 

Scowcroft was appointed Military Assistant to the President in February 1972; and was reassigned as Deputy Assistant to the President for National Security Affairs in January 1973. He was promoted to lieutenant general on August 16, 1974, and retired from active duty at that rank on December 1, 1975. He had, just a month earlier, during the Halloween Massacre, become the United States National Security Advisor (for him, the first time), replacing Henry Kissinger. Scowcroft's continued service in the Air Force would have been contingent on reconfirmation of his rank by the Senate, a distinction that National Security Advisor H. R. McMaster elected to pursue in 2018.

His military decorations and awards included the Air Force Distinguished Service Medal, the Legion of Merit with oak leaf cluster and the Air Force Commendation Medal.

Before joining the Bush administration, Scowcroft was vice chairman of Kissinger Associates. He had a long association with Henry Kissinger, having served as his assistant when Kissinger was the National Security Adviser under Richard Nixon, from 1969.

Scowcroft was long sought after as a respected, professional and largely apolitical or nonpartisan expert (within the standards of fellow White House veterans) and chaired and served on a number of policy advisory councils, including the President's General Advisory Committee on Arms Control, the President's Commission on Strategic Forces, the President's Blue Ribbon Commission on Defense Management, the Defense Policy Board, and the President's Special Review Board (Tower Commission) investigating the Iran–Contra affair. He also served on the Guiding Coalition of the nonpartisan Project on National Security Reform. He was appointed Co-Chair of the Blue Ribbon Commission on America's Nuclear Future from 2010 to 2012 alongside Lee Hamilton.

On the morning of September 11, 2001, Scowcroft was in an E-4B aircraft, also known as the National Airborne Operations Command Center (NAOC), on the taxiway, waiting to takeoff for Offutt Air Force Base, when the first hijacked airliner hit the World Trade Center (WTC). Scowcroft's aircraft was en route to Offutt when the second hijacked airliner struck the WTC. Scowcroft was involved in observing the command and control operations of both President George W. Bush in Florida, and Vice President Dick Cheney, who was at the White House.

Scowcroft was the founder and president of The Forum for International Policy, a think tank. He was also president of The Scowcroft Group, an international business consulting firm. He was co-chair, along with Joseph Nye, of the Aspen Strategy Group. He was a member of the Inter-American Dialogue, Trilateral Commission, and the Council on Foreign Relations and a board member of the Center for Strategic and International Studies and the Atlantic Council.

Scowcroft was a leading Republican critic of American policy towards Iraq before and after the 2003 invasion, which war critics in particular have seen as significant given Scowcroft's close ties to former President George H. W. Bush. He drew attention for reports of remarks critical of Bush – which he did not deny when reported by The Washington Post citing his view that "Bush is 'mesmerized' by Israeli Prime Minister Ariel Sharon, that Iraq was a 'failing venture' and that the administration's unilateralist approach has harmed relations between Europe and the United States." Despite his public criticism of the decision to invade, Scowcroft continued to describe himself as "a friend" of the Bush administration. He also strongly opposed a precipitous withdrawal, arguing that a pull-out from Iraq before the country was able to govern, sustain, and defend itself "would be a strategic defeat for American interests, with potentially catastrophic consequences both in the region and beyond".  Scowcroft went on to stress that the U.S. must "secure the support of the countries of the region themselves. It is greatly in their self-interest to give that support.. unfortunately, in recent years they have come to see it as dangerous to identify with the United States, and so they have largely stood on the sidelines."

He backed the invasion of Afghanistan as a "direct response" to 9/11 terrorism, a war that would go on to last about 20 years.

President George H. W. Bush presented him with the Presidential Medal of Freedom in 1991. In 1993, he was created an Honorary Knight Commander of the Order of the British Empire by Queen Elizabeth II at Buckingham Palace. In 1988, he received the Golden Plate Award of the American Academy of Achievement. In 2005, Scowcroft was awarded the William Oliver Baker Award by the Intelligence and National Security Alliance.

In 1998, he co-wrote A World Transformed with George H. W. Bush. This book described what it was like to be in the White House during the end of the Cold War, as the Soviet Union collapsed in the early 1990s. Notably, both figures explained why they didn't go on to Baghdad in 1991: "Had we gone the invasion route, the United States could conceivably still be an occupying power in a bitterly hostile land." In 1994, Scowcroft co-authored the opinion-editorial "The Time for Temporizing is Over" urging President Bill Clinton to order a preemptive strike on North Korea's Yongbyon nuclear facility unless it readmitted International Atomic Energy Agency inspectors.

His discussions of foreign policy with Zbigniew Brzezinski, led by journalist David Ignatius, were published in a 2008 book titled America and the World: Conversations on the Future of American Foreign Policy.

Scowcroft was a member of the Honorary Council of Advisors for U.S.-Azerbaijan Chamber of Commerce (USACC). Critics have suggested that Scowcroft was unethical in his lobbying for the Turkish and Azeri governments because of his ties to Lockheed Martin and other defense contractors that do significant business with Turkey.
He was also a member of the board of directors of the International Republican Institute, and served on the Advisory Board for Columbia University's School of International and Public Affairs and for America Abroad Media.

Scowcroft endorsed Hillary Clinton in the run-up for the 2016 United States presidential election.

Evaluation
Scholarly evaluations of Scowcroft's performance have been generally favorable. For example Ivo Daalder and I. M. Destler  quoting other scholars, conclude:

"Brent Scowcroft was in many ways the ideal national security adviser—indeed, he offers a model for how the job should be done." His "winning formula" consisted of gaining the trust of the key principals of U.S. foreign policymaking, establishing "a cooperative policy process at all levels," one both transparent and collegial, and keeping an "unbreakable relationship with the president," thanks to their close friendship and mutual respect. The result was that Scowcroft "proved to be an extraordinarily effective national security adviser" in comparison with others who have held the office, particularly in light of the difficult and transformative period in which he held office.Other evaluations from colleagues and national security veterans in both parties echo similar points. 

In a largely laudatory obituary, The New York Times noted "his appeal for public service was a classic reminder of a less partisan age, when presidents often reached out to experienced talent, regardless of party loyalties."

The Atlantic Council provided an assessment, with quotes from several experts after Scowcroft's death, that noted "Looking back on his time working with Scowcroft in the Nixon administration, former US Secretary of State Henry Kissinger explained that 'in a period when America was tearing itself apart,' Scowcroft’s 'steadiness had a calming influence then as did his faith in his country’s ultimate purposes.' Former US Secretary of Defense Robert Gates argued that what 'set Brent apart as National Security Advisor was that he played fair…he did not take advantage of his close relationship with the president to disadvantage others.' John Deutch, former Director of Central Intelligence, recalled that “Brent had the ideal temperament to lead the country. He was smart, deceptively articulate with a calm demeanor that often masked his strategic thinking.'"

Scowcroft award
Scowcroft was the inspiration and namesake for a special presidential award begun under the George H. W. Bush administration. According to Gates, the award is given to the official "who most ostentatiously falls asleep in a meeting with the president". According to Gates, the president "evaluated candidates on three criteria. First, duration—how long did they sleep? Second, the depth of the sleep. Snoring always got you extra points. And third, the quality of recovery. Did one just quietly open one's eyes and return to the meeting, or did you jolt awake and maybe spill something hot in the process?" According to Bush himself, the award "gives extra points for he/she who totally craters, eyes tightly closed, in the midst of meetings, but in fairness a lot of credit is given for sleeping soundly while all about you are doing their thing." Scowcroft had gained a reputation for doing such things to the extent that it became a running gag.

Personal life
Scowcroft married Marian Horner in 1951. His wife, a Pennsylvania native, trained as a nurse at St. Francis School of Nursing in Pittsburgh and graduated from Columbia University. They had one daughter, Karen Scowcroft. Marian Horner Scowcroft, a diabetic, died on July 17, 1995, at George Washington University Hospital.

In March 1993, when Scowcroft was given an honorary KBE by Queen Elizabeth II, his daughter was also received by the Queen.

Death
On August 6, 2020, Scowcroft died at his home in Falls Church, Virginia, at age 95.  On January 29, 2021, Scowcroft was buried at Arlington National Cemetery.

Honors
   Air Force Pilot Badge
    Office of the Joint Chiefs of Staff Identification Badge
   Presidential Service Badge
  Air Force Distinguished Service Medal with three bronze oak leaf cluster
  Legion of Merit with oak leaf cluster
 Presidential Medal of Freedom (1991)
 Department of Defense Medal for Distinguished Public Service (2016)
 Honorary Knight Commander of the Order of the British Empire, Military version (KBE) (1993)
 Order of the Cross of Terra Mariana, 3rd Class (2006)
 Grand Cross of the Order of Merit of the Federal Republic of Germany (2009)
 Grand Cordon of the Order of the Rising Sun (2016)

Honorary degrees

See also
  
 History of the United States National Security Council 1989–1992

References

Further reading
 Daalder, Ivo H., and I. M. Destler. In the Shadow of the Oval Office: Profiles of the National Security Advisers and the Presidents They Served—From JFK to George W. Bush. New York: Simon & Schuster, 2009. . 
 Sparrow, Bartholomew H. "Realism's Practitioner: Brent Scowcroft and the Making of the New World Order, 1989–1993." Diplomatic History, Vol. 34, No. 1, 2010, pp. 141–175. .
 Sparrow, Bartholomew. The Strategist: Brent Scowcroft and the Call of National Security (2015)

Primary sources
 Brzezinski, Zbigniew, and Brent Scowcroft. America and the World: Conversations on the Future of American Foreign Policy. New York: Basic Books, 2008.  / .
 Bush, George H.W., and Brent Scowcroft. A World Transformed. New York: Alfred A. Knopf, 1998. .
 Deutch, John, and Arnold Kanter, Brent Scowcroft. "Saving NATO's Foundation." Foreign Affairs, Vol. 78, No. 6, November/December 1999, pp. 54–67. .
 Perry, William James, and Brent Scowcroft, Charles D. Ferguson. U.S. Nuclear Weapons Policy. Independent Task Force Report, No. 62. Council on Foreign Relations, April 2009. .
 Scowcroft, Brent. "A World in Transformation." The National Interest, No. 119, Special Issue: Crisis of the Old Order, May/June 2012, pp. 7–9. .
 Scowcroft, Brent. "Don't Attack Saddam." Wall Street Journal, August 15, 2002, p. A12.
 Scowcroft, Brent. "Foreword." Burrows, Mathew J. Global Risks 2035: The Search for a New Normal. Atlantic Council, September 2016. .
 Scowcroft, Brent. "Getting the Middle East Back on Our Side." New York Times, January 4, 2007.

External links

 
 
 
 
 Arlington National Cemetery
 
 

|-

|-

|-

|-

1925 births
2020 deaths
20th-century American writers
American Latter Day Saints
American people of Danish descent
American people of English descent
American people of Norwegian descent
American people of Scottish descent
Atlantic Council
Burials at Arlington National Cemetery
Columbia University alumni
Grand Crosses with Star and Sash of the Order of Merit of the Federal Republic of Germany
Honorary Knights Commander of the Order of the British Empire
International Republican Institute
Members of the Inter-American Dialogue
Military personnel from Utah
Nixon administration personnel
Political realists
Presidential Medal of Freedom recipients
Recipients of the Air Force Distinguished Service Medal
Recipients of the Four Freedoms Award
Recipients of the Legion of Merit
Recipients of the Order of the Cross of Terra Mariana, 3rd Class
School of International and Public Affairs, Columbia University alumni
United States air attachés
United States Air Force generals
United States Deputy National Security Advisors
United States Military Academy alumni
United States National Security Advisors
United States presidential advisors
Utah Republicans
Writers from Ogden, Utah
United States Army Air Forces officers